Jim Bartley may refer to:
 Jim Bartley (footballer)
 Jim Bartley (actor)